William M. Forgrave was an American minister and temperance activist who served as Superintendent of the Massachusetts Anti-Saloon League from 1923 to 1928. He later worked as a stock broker and was convicted of larceny.

Early work
Forgrave graduated from the Boston University School of Theology. He began his temperance activities in Raymond, New Hampshire, where he was pastor of the town's Methodist Church. In 1913 he joined the Anti-Saloon League as a speaker. In 1917 he became the district secretary for the Portsmouth, New Hampshire YMCA.

World War I
At the beginning of World War I, Forgrave was a member of the faculty of the War Work Training Commission at the YMCA College. In 1918 he was stationed by the YMCA with American troops in Siberia. After the war he spent two and a half years as the general secretary of the YMCA in Manila.

Massachusetts Anti-Saloon League

Early work
After leaving Manila, Forgrave moved to Springfield, Massachusetts, where he became superintendent of the Central Western district of the Massachusetts Anti-Saloon League. As district superintendent, Forgrave led drives on prohibition law violators in Springfield,  Chicopee, North Adams, Greenfield, and Holyoke. In 1922 he was made an assistant to state superintendent Arthur J. Davis. In 1923 he succeeded Davis as superintendent.

State superintendent
In his first year as superintendent, Forgrave was tasked with leading the group's campaign for the referendum on the state's liquor enforcement code. Although the question had been defeated by 103,000 votes two years before it passed by a majority of 8,000 under Forgrave's leadership. Following Wayne Wheeler's death in 1927, Forgrave was mentioned as his possible successor as national leader, but he decided not to seek the position. 

During his tenure as superintendent, Forgrave made a number of sensational statements against political leaders and law enforcement. In 1924 his accusations that the office of U.S. Attorney Robert O. Harris was lax in enforcing prohibition laws were thrown out by a grand jury for being "vague, misleading and unproved". In 1928, the Massachusetts General Court investigated charges by Forgrave that members of the body held a "wild party" on April 28, 1927 and that liquor confiscated by the Massachusetts Department of Public Safety had been given away. He was unable to produce any strong evidence that such a party occurred and a special investigative committee found his charges unsubstantiated. Forgrave, however, refused to retract his allegations and on July 12, 1928 the Massachusetts House of Representatives voted 97 to 93 to censure him and strip him of his right to act as a legislative agent. The Senate rejected the censure amendment 23 to 10 after Senator Hugh Cregg argued that the amendment was illegal, as no individual had ever been censured without a hearing.

Forgrave resigned as superintendent on November 27, 1928 and was succeeded by Gordon C. McMaster. He decided to step down because he was contemplating divorce and he did not want his personal life to reflect upon the organization. In December 1929, Forgrave divorced his wife in Reno, Nevada and his wife was granted custody of their only daughter. He married his second wife, Anna Helrich on February 28, 1930 in New York City. The two resided with Helrich's family in Everett, Massachusetts until the marriage ended in divorce on October 18, 1933.

Criminal conviction
After leaving the Anti-Saloon League, Forgrave worked as a stock broker in Boston. Following his second divorce he moved to an apartment in Cambridge, Massachusetts. In August 1937, Forgrave's firm, Brown, Anthony & Co., consented to a perpetual injunction issued by the United States District Court for the District of Massachusetts that prevented it from selling securities while insolvent. Later the securities division of the Massachusetts Department of Utilities revoked its brokerage registration on the grounds that the business was running in a fraudulent manner.

On April 20, 1938, Forgrave was indicted on 13 counts of larceny and 11 counts of conspiracy to steal for his alleged involvement in a $100,000 stock swindle. On December 28, 1938, Forgrave was found guilty of 19 counts of larceny and conspiracy.  
He was sentenced to four and a half years, with two and a half to be served at the Charlestown State Prison and the remainder to be served in the House of Correction. He appealed his convictions to the Massachusetts Supreme Judicial Court. While his case was under appeal, Forgrave was held in the Charles Street Jail in lieu of bail. While there, it was alleged that he ran a bookmaking operation in the jail during the reign of Sheriff John F. Dowd. In 1940, the Massachusetts Supreme Judicial Court overturned Forgrave's conspiracy convictions, but upheld his convictions on the larceny charges.

References

American Methodist clergy
American stockbrokers
American temperance activists
American white-collar criminals
Bookmakers
Boston University School of Theology alumni
Criminals from Massachusetts
Springfield College (Massachusetts) faculty
YMCA leaders